WPA architecture may refer to:
PWA/WPA Moderne architecture
WPA Rustic architecture